Oxycanus goodingi is a moth of the family Hepialidae. It is found in Australia.

The larvae feed underground, probably on the roots of Leptospermum scoparium.

References

Moths described in 1935
Hepialidae
Endemic fauna of Australia